Derek Ervin Smith (November 1, 1961 – August 9, 1996) was an American professional basketball player. He won a national championship with the Louisville Cardinals in 1980, and spent nine years in the National Basketball Association (NBA) in a career shortened by a knee injury. He would later become an assistant coach for the Washington Bullets from 1994 until his death.

Career
Smith attended the University of Louisville from 1979 to 1982. He was a member of the 1980 University of Louisville Cardinals basketball team which won the NCAA championship, defeating UCLA 59–54.

Smith is sometimes credited with popularizing the term "high five" during the 1979–80 basketball season.

Smith was selected 35th overall, 13th in the second round, by the Golden State Warriors in the 1982 NBA draft. After his rookie season, he was waived by the Warriors and became a free agent. At the request of Portland Trail Blazers general manager Stu Inman, Smith received a try out with the San Diego Clippers. After impressing Clippers head coach Jim Lynam, Smith was offered a contract for the 1983–84 season. He would play for the San Diego / Los Angeles Clippers from 1983 to 1986. He averaged 22 points per game in 1984–85. In the next season, he averaged 23.5 points per game, but he was limited to 11 games because of a knee injury followed by mononucleosis. He played for the Sacramento Kings from 1986 to 1989, for the Philadelphia 76ers in 1989 and 1990, and for the Boston Celtics in 1991. During his NBA career, he scored over 5,000 points.

Smith became an assistant coach for the Washington Bullets in 1994.

Death
In August 1996, Smith went on a cruise on the Norwegian Cruise Line ship MS Dreamward for season ticketholders of the Bullets and the Washington Capitals. He took his family along. Smith and then-Bullets player Tim Legler volunteered to hold basketball clinics during the cruise.

On August 9, 1996, while the ship was near Bermuda and returning to New York City, Smith suddenly suffered an apparent massive heart attack during a farewell cocktail party in the presence of members of his team. Ship medics attempted to resuscitate him for 25 minutes before declaring him dead.

Smith was buried at Cave Hill Cemetery in Louisville, Kentucky. His funeral was attended by the Bullets team and several former teammates.

Family
Derek was married to Monica, with whom he had two children: a daughter, Sydney, and a son, Nolan. Nolan played college basketball for the Duke Blue Devils and was drafted by the Portland Trail Blazers. In 2010, like his father 30 years before him, Nolan made it to the NCAA D-I tournament; Nolan and his Duke Blue Devils won the National Championship, just as Derek and his Louisville Cardinals had done in 1980. Nolan has a tattoo of his father on his right arm.

In April 2022, Nolan joined the coaching staff at his father's alma mater.

See also

 List of second-generation NBA players

References

External links
NBA & College stats

1961 births
1996 deaths
African-American basketball players
American men's basketball players
Basketball coaches from Georgia (U.S. state)
Basketball players from Georgia (U.S. state)
Boston Celtics players
Burials at Cave Hill Cemetery
Golden State Warriors draft picks
Golden State Warriors players
Los Angeles Clippers players
Louisville Cardinals men's basketball players
People from Hogansville, Georgia
Philadelphia 76ers players
Sacramento Kings players
San Diego Clippers players
Shooting guards
Washington Bullets assistant coaches
20th-century African-American sportspeople